In the Name of Love is a 2008 Indonesian film directed by Rudy Soedjarwo. This film starring by Vino G. Bastian, Acha Septriasa, Christine Hakim, Tutie Kirana, Roy Marten, and Cok Simbara. The film had its premiered at the Jakarta International Film Festival on December 5, 2008.

Cast
 Vino G. Bastian as Abimanyu Hidayat
 Acha Septriasa as Saskia Putri Negara
 Christine Hakim as Citra Mustafa
 Tutie Kirana as Kartika Hidayat
 Roy Marten as Triawan Negara
 Cok Simbara as Satrio Hidayat
 Luna Maya as Rianti Putri Negara Prasetyo
 Lukman Sardi as Aryan Hidayat
 Tengku Firmansyah as Aditya Hidayat
 Nino Fernandez as Banyu Putra Negara
 Yama Carlos as Panji Putra Negara
 Dicky Wahyudi as Gilang Prasetyo
 Panji Rahadi as Dirga

References

External links
 

2008 films
Indonesian drama films
2000s Indonesian-language films
Films directed by Rudy Soedjarwo